Siva Thandavam is a 1977 Indian Malayalam-language film, directed by N. Sankaran Nair. The film stars Kamal Haasan, Jayasudha, M. G. Soman and Kaviyoor Ponnamma in the lead roles. The film has musical score by M. B. Sreenivasan. Kamal Haasan recorded his voice for a song for the first time in Malayalam, although the lyrics were in English.

Cast 
Kamal Haasan
Jayasudha
M. G. Soman
Kaviyoor Ponnamma
Bahadoor

Soundtrack 
The music was composed by M. B. Sreenivasan, and the lyrics were written by Perumpuzha Gopalakrishnan and M. B. Sreenivasan.

Release 

References

External links 
 

1977 films
1970s Malayalam-language films
Films directed by N. Sankaran Nair
Films scored by M. B. Sreenivasan